Roberto Eugenio Cerro, named "Cherro" (23 February 1907 – 11 October 1965) was an Argentine football striker. He was born in Barracas in the city of Buenos Aires in Argentina. He played the majority of his career with Boca Juniors, he scored 221 goals in 305 games for the club (in all official competitions), making him Boca Juniors' highest scoring player until his record was surpassed by Martín Palermo in 2010. He also ranks 5th. among the all-time Primera División top scorers, with 236 goals in 345 league matches.

Cherro won five league titles with Boca Juniors, being also the club's top scorer on five occasions (1926, 1928, and 1930 with 20, 32 and 37 goals respectively). He was also part of the Argentina national team that won the silver medal at the 1928 Summer Olympics. Later, he was a radio sports commentator, together with the renowned Fioravanti, in the 60s.

International career

Cherro won the Copa América in 1929 with the Argentina national football team.

On 5 February 1933, Cherro famously scored all four goals in a 4–1 win over arch enemies Uruguay.

Titles 
Boca Juniors
 Argentine Primera División: (5) 1926, 1930, 1931, 1934, 1935
 Copa Estímulo (1): 1926

References

External links

 Boca Juniors profile 
  

1907 births
1930 FIFA World Cup players
1965 deaths
Footballers from Buenos Aires
Argentine people of Italian descent
Argentine footballers
Argentina international footballers
Association football forwards
Ferro Carril Oeste footballers
Boca Juniors footballers
Argentine Primera División players
Footballers at the 1928 Summer Olympics
Olympic footballers of Argentina
Olympic silver medalists for Argentina
Olympic medalists in football
Copa América-winning players
Medalists at the 1928 Summer Olympics
Boca Juniors managers
Argentine football managers